The district of Aachen is a district in the west of North Rhine-Westphalia, Germany. Neighboring districts are Heinsberg, Düren, Euskirchen, and also the Netherlands province of Limburg and the Belgian province of Liège. Its administrative body is the Städteregionsparlament ("regional parliament"), headed by the Städteregionspräsident or "region president" (Tim Grüttemeier (CDU) since 2019).

History 

Becoming effective on 21 October 2009, the Städteregion Aachen (literally: "cities region" Aachen) was formed from the former district Aachen (Kreis Aachen) and the city of Aachen. This is the first Städteregion that was formed in North Rhine-Westphalia. Its status is similar to that of the district Hanover (Region Hannover) in Lower Saxony, in that the powers of the city of Aachen are slightly less than those of a district-free city (Kreisfreie Stadt).

The former district Aachen was created in 1975 in the reorganization of the district North Rhine-Westphalia, by merging the previous districts (Landkreise) of Aachen and Monschau, and some parts of the districts of Düren, Jülich and Schleiden as well as the Selfkant district, while a part of the former district was incorporated to the district-free city of Aachen.

The Landkreis Aachen was formed in 1816 from the two French cantons Burtscheid and Eschweiler, with its capital set to the city of Burtscheid. In 1897 Burtscheid was incorporated into the city of Aachen, but the administrative seat stayed there, even though the capital was no longer part of the district.

Geography 

Geographically the district covers a part of the Eifel mountains in the south, but also the lowlands of the Lower Rhine Bay.

Coat of arms 
The top of the coat of arms shows the black lion, the sign of Jülich, as the district contains mostly former parts of the duchy of Jülich. In the bottom the swan on a deer antler is the sign of the city of Burtscheid, which was the capital of the Landkreis Aachen until 1897, when it was incorporated into the city of Aachen.

Towns and municipalities

References

External links 

 Official Website (German, English, Dutch, French, Polish)

 
Districts of North Rhine-Westphalia